Streptomyces hundungensis is a bacterium species from the genus of Streptomyces which has been isolated from a quarry in Tangkhul Hundung in Manipur in India Streptomyces hundungensis has antifungal activity.

See also 
 List of Streptomyces species

Further reading

References 

hundungensis
Bacteria described in 2013